This is a list of electoral results for the Gippsland Province in Victorian state elections.

Members for Gippsland Province

Election results

Elections in the 2000s

Elections in the 1990s

Elections in the 1980s

Elections in the 1970s

Elections in the 1960s

 Preferences were not distributed.

Elections in the 1950s

 Two party preferred vote was estimated.

References

Victoria (Australia) state electoral results by district